United Arab Emirates corporate law regulates the governance, finance and power of corporations in the United Arab Emirates (UAE) through UAE law. Every emirate has its own basic corporate code.

Types of Business License

The types of Business Licenses issue in United Arab Emirates (UAE) are professional, commercial, industrial and tourism. The professional license covers services offered by professionals, artisans and craftsmen; the commercial license covers all trading and commercial activities performed with an intention of making profit ; the industrial license covers all industrial and manufacturing activities. The tourism license covers all activities related to hospitality & tourism. The type of license depends on the business activity of the company or enterprise.

Jurisdiction of the Company

In UAE, a company can be formed in any of the following three jurisdictions: Mainland, Free Zone and Offshore. The licensing authority in mainland is the Department of Economic Development of the respective emirates. In Free Zones, the relevant Free Zone Authority will be the licensing authority and respective Offshore Authority in the case of Offshore jurisdiction.

Mainland Company 

A mainland company is an onshore company and license to establish the entity is issued by the Department of Economic Development (DED) of the respective emirate. A mainland business is allowed to do business in the local UAE market as well as outside UAE without any restrictions. It is necessary to understand the term "Mainland" as per DED's definition in order for an entrepreneur to take a decision to register a Mainland Company in UAE. Different types of license under mainland are:

 Professional license
 Commercial license
 Industrial license
 Tourism license

For all licenses, the UAE now allows 100% of shares to be owned by expat individuals. As indicated in the latest decree.
 
Following are the facts about Mainland Companies in UAE.
 These companies are regulated under Federal Law No. 2 of 2015 which came in to effect on 1 July 2015.
 Expatriate can now own 100% shares in any commercial limited liability company (LLC) located in the mainland areas. Earlier, they were only allowed to own 49%
 GCC national can own 100% shares in any company.
 GCC companies or individual GCC national can make partnership with UAE national.
 For certain business activities, as per law only UAE national can own 100% shares.
 Business activities covered under professional category can be 100% owned by expat / foreigners but it is mandatory to have UAE national as a service agent.
 It is considered as on shore business entity in UAE

Free Zone Company 

Establishing a business entity in one of the UAE's many Free trade zones (FTZs) can be an attractive option for foreign investors. UAE has over 35 FTZs of which more than 20 are located in Dubai. 
The main attraction for setting up a company in a free zone is that there is no UAE national shareholding required. All free zones in UAE offer the following incentives:
 100% foreign ownership of the enterprises
 100% cent import and export tax exemptions
 100% repatriation of capital and profits
 No currency restrictions
 Corporate tax exemption for 15 years, renewable for an additional 15 years
 No personal income taxes

UAE Free Zone companies can only operate within the free zone boundaries and are generally limited to performing solely those activities listed in their license(s).

It is mandatory for every company registered in the Free Zone to lease minimum office space within that particular Free Zone. If the number of employees are few - the company can also lease a co-working space which is located within the freezone. However, if the no. of employees are higher - they would be required to lease a dedicated office space within the freezone. A Free Zone Company can obtain UAE residence visas for the director, shareholder and also employees of the company through the Free Zone where it is registered.

Offshore Company 

UAE Offshore company registration is a very popular method of doing business in the Middle East region. 
In UAE there are three offshore jurisdictions – Dubai (Jebel Ali Offshore Company)  Ras Al Khaimah and Ajman. They offer similar services but serve different strategic goals of offshore company registration. The Jebel Ali Offshore Company is an International Business Crown/holds the only offshore vehicle that is permitted to own / hold real estate in the Emirate of Dubai. JAFZA Offshore operated under JAFZA Free zone.

The RAK Offshore and the RAK International Company (RAKICC) are International Business Companies. They provide a flexible and credible option for foreign investors to register an offshore company in UAE without the need to establish a physical presence in the UAE. RAKICC is also allowed to hold the freehold property in Dubai.

UAE Offshore companies offer the following benefits:
 No Corporate tax
 100% foreign ownership
 100% Capital and Profit Repatriation
 UAE Bank Account 
 International Invoicing
 Limited Liability Company
 No TIEAs
 Absolute Privacy and Confidentiality
 Ability to maintain multi-currency Bank accounts in the UAE
 Virtual office facilities available in the UAE

Legal Forms of Business
The common legal forms of business in Mainland, Free zone and Offshore formation in the UAE are:
 Sole proprietorship
 Civil Company
 Limited Liability Company (LLC)
 Partnership
 Private Share Holding Company
 Public Share Holding Company
 Branch of Foreign Companies/Representative Office
 Branch of GCC companies
 Branch of Free zone company
 Branch of Dubai based companies
 Branch of UAE based companies

Under Law of UAE, there are five types of business establishments applicable to foreign entities interested in establishing their presence in the UAE. UAE government has implemented wide range of economic and administrative policies which has made UAE an attractive business destination.

A company can create a permanent establishment, create an entity in any of the UAE free zone, enter into a commercial agency agreement, establish a branch office, create a civil company (currently possible to establish a company in Dubai, Sharjah and Ajman).

Limited Liability Company 

A Limited Liability Company (LLC) is the most common type of registration in the UAE and is recommended where the purpose of the entity is to make sales within the region. However, 100% foreign ownership of such an entity is not permitted. Under the UAE Commercial Companies Law (CCL), foreign investors are permitted to hold up to 49 per cent equity ownership in UAE companies and 51 per cent of the equity must be held at all times by one or more UAE nationals.

In accordance with Article (218) of the CCL a Limited Liability Company can be formed by a minimum of 1 (as per Article 8 of the Federal Commercial Company Law of 2015) and a maximum of 50 shareholders whose liability is limited to their shares in the capital of the company. Recent amendments to Article (217) of the CCL that came into force in June 2009 removed the requirement for minimum share capital (previously AED 300,000 in Dubai and AED 150,000 in other Emirates) allowing founders of a limited liability company the freedom to determine the company’s share capital which could be less than the earlier prescribed bottom line.

A LLC must appoint a minimum of one manager and up to a maximum of five managers for the business. Managers must be appointed by a Memorandum of Association or by a management contract, for a fixed term or an unlimited term. Unless the Memorandum of Association states otherwise, the manager has full powers of administration and management of the LLC. LLC is not allowed to practice its activities in the UAE without a Trade License and Commercial Registration Certificate.

Branch / Representative Office 

A branch office has the same legal identity as its parent company and conducts business under the name of its parent company. A branch office may only be engaged in activities similar to those of its parent company but it is not permitted to carry on the business of importing the products of its parent company, a function reserved for local trade agents. In some cases the Branch of a foreign company are required to obtain an additional license from UAE Ministry of Economy.

Representative office, on the other hand, is limited to promoting its parent company’s activities i.e. gathering information and soliciting orders and projects to be performed by the company’s head office.

A UAE national must be appointed as a ‘service agent’ for the branch or representative office.

Civil Company 

A civil company is a business partnership for professionals like doctors, lawyers, engineers and accountants.
A civil company is 100% owned by the professional partners (except for engineering civil company), however, a UAE National Local Service Agent is normally required.  
A foreign company can be a partner in a civil company, as long as the foreign company is in the same field as the civil company.

See also 
Judicial system in the United Arab Emirates
Legal system of the United Arab Emirates

References 

 GF Tax Cooperation (TIEAs)

Corporate law
Law of the United Arab Emirates

Mwmideast